The California Grand Casino is a cardroom located in Pacheco, California.  The original hotel and card room was a Pony Express stop in 1860.  According to Card Player magazine, the California Grand Casino is the oldest continuously operating poker room in the world, with poker games since 1854.

A new casino facility opened across the street in July 2009 with 19 gaming tables, a bar and a restaurant called The Grand Cafe. For seven years in a row, the California Grand Casino was voted Best Casino in the San Francisco East Bay by the Bay Area News Group, which includes the Contra Costa Times, San Jose Mercury News and Oakland Tribune.

History

The casino started in 1854 when the Woodford Hotel and Saloon opened its doors on what is now Pacheco Boulevard and offered alcohol, prostitution, and gambling.  The hotel became a stagecoach and Wells Fargo Pony Express Stop in 1860.   The original building bears a historical marker from the Pony Express Trail Association.  In 2009, the California Grand Casino moved into a new building.

Games
The California Grand Casino offers Texas hold 'em poker games. The poker games all feature three blinds, meaning that the player on the button also posts a blind bet. This leads to more players seeing the flop and more action in the games. The Casino has a number of poker jackpots and prizes with more than $27 million in jackpots paid to players.

The California Grand Casino also has Hot Action Blackjack, Baccarat, Three Card Poker, and Pai Gow Poker games. In California, the casino does not bank the games, so these games are played with a rotating dealer position so every player has the chance to play the dealer hand and wager against the other players, but the casino dealer still does the actual dealing and settling of all wagers.

See also
List of casinos in California

References

External links

Casinos in California
Martinez, California
Pony Express stations
Tourist attractions in the San Francisco Bay Area
History of Contra Costa County, California
1860 establishments in California